The Canadian Screen Award for Best Achievement in Sound Mixing is awarded by the Academy of Canadian Cinema and Television to the best work by a sound designer in a Canadian film. Formerly known as Best Overall Sound, it was renamed to Best Sound Mixing at the 9th Canadian Screen Awards in 2021.

1960s

1970s

1980s

1990s

2000s

2010s

2020s

See also
Prix Iris for Best Sound

References

 
Sound
Film sound awards